Treggiaia is a village in Tuscany, central Italy, administratively a frazione of the comune of Pontedera, province of Pisa. At the time of the 2001 census its population was 751.

Treggiaia is about 32 km from Pisa and 6 km from Pontedera.

References 

Frazioni of the Province of Pisa